National Express Coventry is a bus operator providing services in Coventry. It is a subsidiary of National Express operating on the operators licence of National Express West Midlands.

History

In October 1986 the bus operations of the West Midlands Passenger Transport Executive were separated into West Midlands Travel to comply with the Transport Act 1985. In April 1995 West Midlands Travel was sold to National Express and in September 1996 was re-branded as Travel West Midlands.

In November 2002 the Coventry depot attained a more local identity and began trading as Travel Coventry. In February 2008 it was re-branded as National Express Coventry.

Network review
An entire network review took place on 26 February 2012, which resulted in frequency improvements on key corridors in the city. Many routes were extensively revised or renumbered whilst there were some routes which were removed and others were introduced. When launched some changes were seen as controversial but the new network is designed to be simpler. Since then extensive service monitoring, reliability checks and public feedback have resulted in some further minor timing changes to some services to further improve the punctuality of services to their customers.

The new network is colour coded and the colours of routes are displayed on the network map and on timetables, the buses themselves are being route branded to match these colours. Route 21 was the first route to have the new route branding applied, with routes 9, 9A, 20, 20A & 20E receiving their branding in April 2013 as well as routes 8/8A getting branding in June 2013. The route 4 also used the branding on the bendibus, but this bus was finally disused on 20 March 2018. The route branding for routes 9/9A led to a public debate about the correct spelling of a Coventry suburb to go on the side of the buses with residents arguing it has been spelt officially as both Styvechale and Stivichall on road signs, shops and local amenities.

Fare structure
A flat fare structure is in operation within the Coventry boundary; people can travel on almost all of its buses, and to almost everywhere on its network, for a fixed price. Graduated fares apply on route 11 to/from Kenilworth & Leamington Spa and the X1 to Birmingham. As with some other urban operators, no change is given for security and speed of boarding.

A range of fares are available including singles and daysavers and their own travelcards which are available for 1-day, 1-week, 4-week and 52-week periods of validity. Off-peak, evening and group tickets are also available. Also Network West Midlands multi-operator tickets are issued and accepted on the companies buses within the Coventry boundary and to/from Keresley and Middlemarch Business Park. The Network West Midlands tickets are not valid on their route 20 beyond the M6 bridge to/from Bedworth or on routes 11 beyond Gibbet Hill to/from Kenilworth and Leamington Spa.

A travel shop is located at Pool Meadow Bus Station which sells both bus and coach tickets and handles enquiries. Coventry and the West Midlands allows contactless payments through the m-Ticket app or credit cards, Swift Pay as you Go, along with exact change cash fares.

Regular ticket inspections take place aided by the Safer Travel also known as Network West Midlands team which is a partnership that was created in 2005 between Centro and West Midlands Police. The partnership is committed to reducing crime and anti social behavior across the West Midlands bus network whilst providing reassurance to the travelling public. Safer travel has also created the 'See Something, Say Something' campaign, where passengers are encouraged to anonymously send information about nuisance behavior on buses by text message.

Voluntary multilateral agreement & PrimeLines

PrimeLines was a partnership between National Express Coventry, other bus operators, Coventry City Council and Centro to deliver high quality bus corridors in Coventry complete with real-time information, bus priority schemes and modern buses. This has been replaced by a new citywide partnership agreement, which has been agreed between Centro, Coventry City Council, Passenger Focus and bus operators with the aim of giving passengers faster, more punctual services as well as shorter waiting times and a more comfortable journey across the network. The three-year agreement came as part of the 2012 network review of bus services in Coventry.

See also
List of bus operators of the United Kingdom

References

External links

Company website

National Express companies
Transport in Coventry